Old Glory DC RFC is a professional rugby union team based in the Washington, D.C., area that is a member of Major League Rugby (MLR). Old Glory was founded in 2018, played some exhibition games in 2019, and began regular-season MLR play in 2020.

The organization is led by two local business leaders, former USA Eagles' Paul Sheehy, and local club rugby player Chris Dunlavey. The Scottish Rugby Union has a part ownership of the team. The team  has been coached by Josh Syms since October 2022.

History
Major League Rugby (MLR) announced on May 15, 2018, that an MLR expansion team would begin play in Washington, D.C., by the 2020 season and confirmed the team in November 2018. On February 6, 2019, the team name was announced as Old Glory DC.

On March 28, 2019, the Scottish Rugby Union announced that it had purchased a minority interest in the team.

Old Glory DC moved to Segra Field in Loudoun County, Virginia, for the 2021 season. The team will return to Segra Field for the 2022 season.

After losing seven matches in a row to start the 2022 season, Old Glory DC announced the immediate departure of head coach Andrew Douglas on March 29, 2022. At the time of his departure, he was the longest-tenured head coach in MLR, having joined for the 2019 exhibition season before the first MLR season in 2020. He left with a 10-17-1 overall MLR record and a 37.5% winning percentage. Three days later, on April 1, Old Glory DC announced that former NOLA Gold head coach Nate Osborne would serve as an interim head coach for the remainder of the season while the team conducts a search for a permanent replacement. On October 31, 2022, Josh Syms was announced as the new head coach.

Sponsorship

Roster

The Old Glory DC squad for the 2023 Major League Rugby season is:

 Senior 15s internationally capped players are listed in bold.
 MLR teams are allowed to field up to ten overseas players per match.

Head coaches
  Andrew Douglas (2019–March 2022)
  Nate Osborne (April 2022-October 2022) interim
  Josh Syms (October 2022-present)

Captains
  Josh Brown (2019) (Captain)
  Mungo Mason (2020–2021) (Co-captain)
  Thretton Palamo (2020–2021) (Co-captain)
  Danny Tusitala (2022) (Captain)
  Jamason Faʻanana-Schultz (2023-present) (Captain)
  Stan South (2023-present) (Vice Captain)

Records

Season standings

2019 season
All games in the 2019 season were exhibition games and did not count in the MLR standings.

2020 season
On March 12, 2020, MLR announced the season would go on hiatus immediately for 30 days due to fears surrounding the 2019–2020 coronavirus pandemic. It was cancelled the following week.

2021 season

2022 season

Exhibition
Old Glory played two preseason matches in January 2022. Both matches were held at the St. James Sports Complex, a series of indoor fields in Springfield, Virginia.

Regular season
Old Glory played eighteen matches in the regular season with two bye weeks. Their home matches were played at Segra Field in Leesburg, Virginia. Because the MLR's Eastern Conference has one team fewer than the Western Conference, Old Glory played the Toronto Arrows three times in the regular season, once at home and twice in Toronto.

2023 season
Old Glory will play 16 games in the 2023 season. All 8 home games will be played at Segra Field.

Notes

References

External links
 

 
Major League Rugby teams
Rugby clubs established in 2018
Rugby union teams in Washington, D.C.
2018 establishments in Washington, D.C.
2019 in sports in Washington, D.C.
2020 in sports in Washington, D.C.